Grana is a comune (municipality) in the Province of Asti in the Italian region Piedmont, located about  east of Turin and about  northeast of Asti.

Grana borders the following municipalities: Calliano, Casorzo, Castagnole Monferrato, Grazzano Badoglio, Moncalvo, Montemagno, and Penango.

Demographic evolution

References

Cities and towns in Piedmont